The Willamette Valley is a geographic region in northwest Oregon, United States.

Willamette Valley may also refer to:

Willamette Valley (ecoregion), the associated ecoregion
Willamette Valley (train), Amtrak-operated train in the same area
Willamette Valley AVA, the American Viticultural Area in the region
MV Willamette Valley, a 1928 Q-ship that served as HMS Edgehill during World War 2